Common Cause was an organisation formed during the Second World War to consider post-war reconstruction and society. It became a popular movement but was tainted by accusations of Communism.

History
Common Cause was founded in 1943 as a vehicle for a number of idealistic community leaders of diverse backgrounds to discuss the post-war economic and social future of South Australia. Charter members were:
Professor K. S. Isles (chairman)
A. A. Angrave (secretary of Plasterers' Union)
Dr. A. R. Callaghan (principal of Roseworthy College)
Sidney Crawford (chairman of C.M.V. Motors)
Charles Duguid (medical doctor and advocate for Aboriginal advancement)
Tom Garland (secretary of the Gasworkers' Union)
Rev. Guy Pentreath (head of St. Peter's College)
Professor G. V. Portus
Alex M. Ramsay (economist)
W. A. Sams (State organiser for the Shop Assistants' Union and executive member of the Communist Party)
Gilbert Seaman (statistical and research officer of the Commonwealth Treasury Department.)
A. B. Thompson (president, United Trades and Labour Council)
John W. Wainwright (Auditor-General, South Australian Government)
D. R. Watson (hairdresser)
The idealistic aims of the organisation found favour with a large section of the community, disenchanted by the Great Depression and tired of the war and looking forward to a future of industrial peace and prosperity.
A. J. Hannan of Medindie (the Crown Solicitor) was a prominent critic, accusing it of being either a Communist front organisation or susceptible to takeover by Communists by virtue of its open membership and support by the Union movement. Rev. E. S. Kiek of Parkin College made a passionate defence of Common Cause, and was supported by large number of ministers of religion who were also members.

At its first Annual General Meeting K. S. Isles, was re-elected president; vice presidents elected were A. B. Thompson and G. V. Portus; hon. treasurer L. J. Mulroney; minute secretary Maurice Brown; executive council Sidney Crawford, A. A. Drummond,  Mrs. Fairbank, T. Garland, Mrs. K. S. Isles, J. H. Knight, and Dr. J. Lugg. They had a meeting room on Waymouth Street.

The organisation helped found a kindergarten and community centre at Nuriootpa, a town with a well-developed community spirit, and where the aims of Common Cause were particularly welcomed. In 1944 Common Cause published a booklet A Township starts to live : the valley of Barossa : South Australia's new community.  Crawford, a prime mover in its foundation, retired shortly after.

Isles resigned as president on the eve of his departure for London on Army business.

Common Cause disbanded in 1949.

References 

1943 establishments in Australia
1949 disestablishments in Australia
Organisations based in Adelaide
Think tanks based in Australia